Kismatpur is a census town in Ranga Reddy district, Telangana, India. It falls under Gandipet Mandal. However, the village was merged into the HMDA and this is one of the biggest triggers for fast infrastructural growth and development in the area. Kismatpur offers good infrastructure to residents and is well planned with good connectivity options for its residents.  

Nawab Khwaja Abid Siddiqi is buried Here in  Kismatpur near Attapur Himayatsagar only a few Kilometres from where he had died at Golconda. He is the ancestor of the Nizams of Hyderabad, and was the Chief Commander of Aurangzeb's Army during the siege of Golconda. 

With steady growth in the Real Estate sector, Hyderabad is witnessing development and transformation of several surrounding areas on its outskirts. Kismatpur is one such area which may well be the next big real estate hotspot in Telangana.

Developments 
Here are some of the key aspects that make Kismatpur a good bet for future growth 

 Kismatpur is directly linked to the Outer Ring Road at the Appa Junction. 
 The Rajiv Gandhi International Airport is just 20 kilometres away from Kismatpur. 
 The Financial District at Gachibowli is also located only 14 kilometres away. 
 Kismatpur is popular amongst professionals working in the IT and ITeS sectors and in the Financial District for its proximity to their places of work, serene and peaceful ambience and rapidly developing infrastructure. 
 Kismatpur offers comparatively affordable housing units to buyers including several apartments and villas alike. The reasonable pricing is a major draw for buyers working in Financial District , Gachibowli and other surrounding areas. 
 The Mehdipatnam Junction is just 8 kilometres away from the locality. 
 The area is a magnet for first-time home buyers and young families with prices being reasonable and there being many options in the entry-level and mid-range category. 
 Bus connectivity is good in the area with easy access to Vikarabad, Chevella, Chilkur, Shamshabad and several other areas. 
 Roads going to Bandlaguda from Kismatpur are now being extended into two-way thoroughfares. 
 An elevated flyover will be built from Nalgonda X Roads to the Owaisi Hospital and the Chandrayan Gutta Flyover will be extended for enabling seamless traffic flow between Kismatpur and Malakpet.

Facilities 
Kismatpur has seen multiple new projects being developed in recent times nearby including PBEL City, Urbanwinds by Gowra Ventures, Maple Town Villas, SMR Harmony, Giridhari Executive Park, ISOLA and many more. The growth of Cyberabad into a major IT hotspot has definitely led to the development of Kismatpur. It is home to the Sri Raghavendra Sports Estate which is a major Cricket venue and there is a major suburb named Suncity inside the locality which is home to several supermarkets and stores including Heritage Fresh, Reliance Fresh and More shop among others. 

There are several banquet halls in the area which is also dotted by trees and the military zone is also well maintained. The surrounding areas include Gandamguda, Bandlaguda, Peerancheruvu and Hydershakote. There is easy access to the Mrugavani National Park and the Osman Sagar and Himayat Sagar fresh water lakes as well.

Education 
Some of the leading educational institutions in the area include,

 Hidayah Islamic International School
 TIME School
 Glendale Academy
 Shadan Institute of Medical Sciences 
 Army Public School 
 Kinderland Preschool 
 Baalyam Pre-School & Daycare
 Little Angels School
 Don Bosco School 
 Pristine Public School 
 Archangels High School 
 Living Bridge Montessori School 
 Small Wonders Play School 
 Global Discovery Academy
 New Little Scholars High School

Hospitals 
Here are some of the key healthcare centers in and around the area: 

 Cocoon Hospital 
 Crayons Hospital 
 Al Shifa Mother & Child Hospital 
 Amaan Multi Specialty Hospital 
 Sun City Nursing Home

Key Attractions 
Here are some of the key attractions in and around the area: 

 Sri Raghavendra Sports Estate 
 Mantra Mall and Cinepolis 
 Mcube Mall and Multiplex 
 Ocean Park 
 Himayat Sagar lake 
 Chilkoor Balaji Temple
 Osman Sagar lake 
 Sangam 
 Kali Temple 
 Golkonda Fort

References

Cities and towns in Ranga Reddy district